The following is the list of squads for each of the 12 women's teams competing in the 2014 Women's World Wheelchair Basketball Championship, held in Toronto, Ontario, Canada between 20 and 28 June 2014. Each team selected a squad of 12 players for the tournament.

Athletes are given an eight-level score specific to wheelchair basketball, ranging from 0.5 to 4.5. Lower scores represent a higher degree of disability. The sum score of all players on the court for one team cannot exceed 14.

Group A

Head coach: Tom Kyle
Assistant coaches: David Gould and Troy Sachs

Head coach: Gertjan van der LindenAssistant coach: Irene Sloof

Head coach: Pascal MontetAssistant Coach: Carolina Vincenzoni

Head coach: Luis Eduardo Ovalle

Head coach: Aaron Davila

Head coach: Stephanie WheelerAssistant coach: Trooper Johnson

Source:

Group B

Head coach: Tiago Costa Baptista

Head coach: Holger Glinicki

Head coach: Bill JohnsonAssistant coaches: Michael Broughton and Michele Hynes

Head coach: Miles ThompsonAssistant coach: Matthew Foden

Head coach: Tiehua Liu

Head coach: Kaori Tachibana

Source:

See also
2014 FIBA World Championship for Women squads

References

External links
Official site of the 2014 Wheelchair Basketball World Championship

Squad
Basketball squads